Gilson Sequeira da Costa (born 24 September 1996) is a Portuguese professional footballer who plays for Cypriot club Doxa Katokopias as a midfielder.

Club career
On 15 August 2015, Costa made his professional debut with Benfica B in a 2015–16 Segunda Liga match against Penafiel.

References

External links
 Benfica official profile  
 Stats and profile at LPFP 
 
 
 National team data 
 

1996 births
Living people
People from São Tomé
Portuguese footballers
Portugal youth international footballers
Portuguese people of São Tomé and Príncipe descent
Association football midfielders
Sporting CP footballers
C.F. Os Belenenses players
S.L. Benfica B players
F.C. Arouca players
Boavista F.C. players
G.D. Estoril Praia players
Doxa Katokopias FC players
Liga Portugal 2 players
Primeira Liga players
Cypriot First Division players
Portuguese expatriate footballers
Expatriate footballers in Cyprus
Portuguese expatriate sportspeople in Cyprus